The Rufus Oldenburger Medal is an award given by the American Society of Mechanical Engineers recognizing significant contributions and outstanding achievements in the field of automatic control. It was established in 1968 in the honor of  Rufus Oldenburger.

Recipients
Source: ASME

 1968: Rufus Oldenburger
 1969: Nathaniel B. Nichols
 1970: John R. Ragazzini
 1971: Charles Stark Draper
 1972: Albert J. Williams, Jr.
 1973: Clesson E. Mason
 1974: Herbert W. Ziebolz
 1975: Hendrik Wade Bode and Harry Nyquist
 1976: Rudolf E. Kálmán
 1977: Gordon S. Brown and Harold L. Hazen
 1978: 
 1979: Henry M. Paynter
 1980: Arthur E. Bryson, Jr.
 1981: Shih-Ying Lee
 1982: Bernard Friedland
 1983: Jesse Lowen Shearer
 1984: Herbert H. Richardson
 1985: Karl Johan Åström
 1986: Eliahu I. Jury
 1987: Walter R. Evans
 1988: Robert H. Cannon, Jr.
 1989: 
 1990: Harold Chestnut
 1991: John G. Truxal
 1992: Isaac M. Horowitz
 1993: Lotfi A. Zadeh
 1994: Howard H. Rosenbrock
 1995: George Leitmann
 1996: George D. Zames
 1997: Thomas B. Sheridan
 1998: David G. Luenberger
 1999: Yu-Chi Ho
 2000: 
 2002: Masayoshi Tomizuka
 2003: Vadim Utkin
 2004: Alistair MacFarlane
 2005: Roger W. Brockett
 2006: J. Karl Hedrick
 2007: 
 2008:	A. Galip Ulsoy
 2009:	Neville J. Hogan
 2010: 
 2011: Haruhiko Harry Asada
 2012: Mathukumalli Vidyasagar
 2013: Graham C. Goodwin
 2014: Robert R. Bitmead
 2015: Manfred Morari
 2016: Jean-Jacques Slotine
 2017: Miroslav Krstić
 2018: Roberto Horowitz
 2019: Huei Peng
 2020: Mark W. Spong
 2021: Shankar Sastry
 2022: Wayne J. Book

See also

 List of people in systems and control
 List of engineering awards
 List of mechanical engineering awards

External links
 

Systems sciences awards
Systems sciences organizations
Awards of the American Society of Mechanical Engineers